Puerto Rico Highway 107 (PR-107), or Carretera Pedro Albizu Campos, is a north–south highway located in Aguadilla, Puerto Rico. It extends from PR-2 to Ramey Air Force Base.

Major intersections

See also

 List of highways numbered 107

References

External links
 

107
Aguadilla, Puerto Rico